The Prosecution of Offences Act 1985 (c. 23) was an Act of Parliament in the United Kingdom.  Its main effects were to establish the Crown Prosecution Service (CPS), to transfer the responsibility of prosecution of offences from the police to the CPS, and to codify the prosecution process.

References

External links
Text of the Act as in force today (including any amendments) within the United Kingdom, from legislation.gov.uk.

United Kingdom Acts of Parliament 1985
Acts of the Parliament of the United Kingdom concerning England and Wales